The Coastal GasLink pipeline is a TC Energy natural gas pipeline under construction in British Columbia, Canada. Starting in Dawson Creek, the pipeline's route crosses through the Canadian Rockies and other mountain ranges to Kitimat, where the gas will be exported to Asian customers. Its route passes through several First Nations peoples' traditional lands, including some that are unceded. Controversy around the project has highlighted important divisions within the leadership structure of impacted First Nations: elected band councils established by the 1876 Indian Act support the project, but traditional hereditary chiefs of the Wetʼsuwetʼen people oppose the project on ecological grounds and organized blockades to obstruct construction on their traditional land.

A court injunction against protesters blocking the project in an effort to defend their unceded land was granted twice by the BC Supreme Court, in 2018 and 2019. In 2019 and 2020, the Royal Canadian Mounted Police (RCMP) entered the blocked area and cleared road access for construction using the threat of lethal force, arresting several of the land defenders. The 2020 arrests sparked widespread protests across Canada in solidarity with the original protests. Protests targeted government offices, ports and rail lines. A protest in February 2020 by the Mohawk First Nation people of Tyendinaga in Ontario blocked a critical segment of rail, causing Via Rail to shut down much of its passenger rail network and Canadian National Railway (CNR) to shut down freight service in eastern Canada for several weeks.

Coastal GasLink (CGL) resumed construction after the RCMP cleared Wetʼsuwetʼen from the access road, however the pipeline project is still opposed by the Wetʼsuwetʼen hereditary chiefs. The Wetʼsuwetʼen asked CGL to halt construction due to the COVID-19 pandemic, over concerns about spreading the disease. Construction has largely continued, though several stop-work orders were issued by the provincial government in June 2020 following an environmental assessment. When CGL attempted to drill under the Wedzin-kwa river, further conflict erupted as Wet'suwet'en defenders erected blockades and destroyed construction equipment. These blockades were removed in November, 2021. By September 2022, CGL had equipment in place to drill under the river; the company said they had completed eight of ten river crossings required for the project and were nearing 70% completion at that time.

Project description

The route passes through the traditional territories of several Indigenous peoples, including the Wet'suwet'en. The Wet'suwet'en traditional government does not consent to the construction of the pipeline, the RCMP have violently displaced members of the Nation multiple times in order to build this pipeline. The natural gas transported by the pipeline will be converted into liquefied natural gas by the LNG Canada plant in Kitimat and then exported to global markets. In particular, the company expects the primary market for the natural gas will be Asian nations planning to convert from coal-fired power plants.

The initial estimated cost to construct the pipeline was  billion. The project is owned and will be operated by TC Energy. LNG Canada selected TC Energy to design, build, and own the pipeline in 2012. In December 2019, investment management firm Aimco and private equity firm KKR entered into an agreement to buy a 65% equity interest in the project for an estimated . The deal was closed May 25, 2020 and by August 2020, construction of the pipeline was underway. By the end of July 2022 it was announced that approximately 70% of the pipeline had been completed and the cost of the project had increased to CA$11.2 billion.

Opponents and proponents
The project is opposed by the hereditary chiefs of the Wetʼsuwetʼen, other First Nations peoples, and environmental activists.

Hereditary chiefs claim jurisdiction over and responsibility to protect traditional Wet'suwet'en territory. They state that the jurisdiction of elected band councils, imposed under the Indian Act, is limited to their reserves. They note that  of Wetʼsuwetʼen territory was never ceded to the Government of Canada. The then colony of British Columbia did not enter into treaties with the Wetʼsuwetʼen people before joining Canada, and the chiefs claim that aboriginal title over the Wetʼsuwetʼen peoples' traditional land has not been extinguished as a consequence. The Supreme Court of Canada affirmed hereditary chiefs' land claims in the 1997 Delgamuukw v British Columbia decision.

Hereditary chief Freda Huson is an organizer of the Unist'ot'en Camp, a protest camp and indigenous healing center in Northern BC. She states that, "Without our land, we aren't who we are. The land is us and we are the land," and also that the energy industry wants to, "take, take, take. And they aren’t taking no for an answer."

Others oppose the pipeline on environmental grounds. "When burned, this natural gas (transported through the completed pipeline) is equivalent 585.5 million pounds of CO2 a day...13 percent of Canada's daily greenhouse gas emissions in 2017." In 2018, environmental activist Michael Sawyer challenged the approval of the pipeline, filing a formal application to require the federal National Energy Board to do a full review. The NEB ruled that the project fell under the jurisdiction of the province of British Columbia, and its British Columbia Oil and Gas Commission. The pipeline also may have an impact on Wet’suwet’en waterways. Sleydo’, a Gidimt’en clan chief said, “You could swim in that lake and just open your mouth and drink the water, it’s so pristine, and the river is so clear that you can see these very deep spawning beds that the salmon have been returning to for thousands of years.” Outside of the pipeline itself, construction activities near and around waterways like blasting and riprap armoring could harm the local fish population.

Some indigenous organizations support the pipeline. The First Nations Liquefied Natural Gas Alliance objected to BC and UN human rights officials who called for a stop to pipeline construction, saying that these officials did not consult indigenous groups supportive of the pipeline before issuing their statements. The First Nations LNG alliance pointed to opportunities for indigenous contracting and "extensive" consultation with indigenous people. Crystal Smith, chief counsellor of the Haisla Nation, which has signed an agreement to allow the pipeline to pass through its traditional land, stated that "First Nations have been left out of resource development for too long...But we are involved, we have been consulted and we will ensure there are benefits for all First Nations."  Victor Jim, an elected chief of the Wetʼsuwetʼen, also signed off on the benefits deal. On February 19, 200 members of the Wetʼsuwetʼen community attended a meeting in Houston organized by the pro-pipeline The North Matters group. Robert Skin, a councillor with the Skin Tyee First Nation, said the project "will look after our children and our children’s children." He was critical of the protesters: "They want to stand up with their fists in the air, but I say come and listen to us and get the other side of the story before you go out there and stop traffic and stop the railroad." According to Paul Manly, Green Member of Parliament for Nanaimo-Ladysmith, the elected councils have not "consented" but merely "conceded," to the project, seen as inevitable.

The project and the protests exposed divisions within the Wetʼsuwetʼen and Mohawk First Nations. The hereditary chiefs of the Wetʼsuwetʼen opposed the project, while the elected band councils supported it, leading to a call for "a cohesive voice". The railroad blockade by the Tyendinaga Mohawks in February 2020 was not organized by the band leadership, while the Haudenosaunee Confederacy external relations committee issued a statement condemning the "RCMP Invasion". The hereditary chiefs travelled to the various Mohawk communities to give thanks for their support but met with a third organization, the Mohawk Nation, a separate form of government comprising the various Mohawk communities in Canada and the United States. Grand Chief Serge Otsi Simon of the Kanesatake Mohawk First Nation called on protesters to end the rail blockades as a show of good faith. "Bringing down the blockades doesn't mean that you surrender. It doesn't mean we're going to lay down and let them kick us around. No, it would show compassion. I'm simply pleading with the protesters ... Have you made your point yet? Has the government and industry understood? I think they did." The next day, Simon disavowed his comments after reserve residents barred him from the band council office. Columnist John Ivison suggested that the situation highlights a need to move on a legislative framework for restructuring authority between the elected councils mandated by the Indian Act and traditional hereditary governments.

Project history

Consultations

Consultation with local band councils was held as part of the planning and environmental review process between 2012 and 2014. As a result of the 1997 Delgamuukw v British Columbia court case of the Gitxsan and Wet'suwet'en peoples, comprehensive consultations with hereditary chiefs are also required for major projects in traditional lands. During consultations, the Office of the Wet'suwet'en proposed alternative routes for the pipeline through areas that had already been disturbed by other infrastructure projects. These routes were rejected by Coastal GasLink on August 21, 2014 in a letter that stated that the routes were unsuitable for a pipeline of the proposed diameter, closer to urban communities, and would extend development time by requiring consultation with four additional First Nations. On January 27, Coastal GasLink president David Pfeiffer stated that the current route was the most technically viable and minimized impact to the environment. On February 14, 2020, Coastal GasLink released a 2014 letter in which Coastal GasLink proposed an alternate route called the Morice River North Alternate that would have moved the project three to five kilometres north of the present route, but it went unanswered by the office of the Wetʼsuwetʼen hereditary chiefs. According to Coastal GasLink, the company has held over 120 meetings with the hereditary chiefs since 2012 and over 1,300 phone calls and emails, but they have nonetheless been unable to agree on a route for the pipeline.

Approval process
Approval was given by twenty elected First Nation band councils (including the Wetʼsuwetʼen elected band council) along the proposed route and the Government of British Columbia.

As a part of their agreement, TC Energy announced it will be awarding  million in contract work to northern B.C. First Nations.

The BC Environmental Assessment Office approved the pipeline project in 2014. The project submitted an application for permits to construct the pipeline to the BC Oil and Gas Commission (BCOGC) in 2014 and was granted all necessary permits by the BCOGC between 2015 and 2016.

Protests 

Protests began with the Wetʼsuwetʼen hereditary chiefs that oppose the project (including 8 out of 9 sitting house chiefs) and other land defenders blocking access to the pipeline construction camps in Wetʼsuwetʼen territory. On January 7, 2019, the RCMP conducted a raid and dismantled the blockades after CGL was granted an injunction by the BC Supreme Court, arresting several Wetʼsuwetʼen land defenders. On January 10, the Wetʼsuwetʼen and RCMP came to an agreement to allow access. The blockades were subsequently rebuilt. After the RCMP again removed the Wetʼsuwetʼen blockades and arrested Wetʼsuwetʼen land defenders in February 2020, solidarity protests sprang up across Canada. Many were rail blockades, including the blocking of the main CNR rail line through Eastern Ontario. Passenger rail and freight rail movements were blocked for several weeks, leading to rationing of goods, other goods backlogged and several major ports being shut down.

Wetʼsuwetʼen protesters blocked the Morice Forest Service Road that provides access to construction of the pipeline project. The first injunction was issued by the B.C. Supreme Court in December 2018. The RCMP set up a temporary local office on the Morice Forest Service Road to enforce the injunction. This injunction was extended by the B.C. Supreme Court on December 31, 2019. The extension included an order authorizing the RCMP to enforce the injunction. The hereditary chiefs ordered the eviction of the RCMP and Coastal GasLink personnel.

The RCMP announced January 30, 2020, that they would stand down while the hereditary chiefs and the province met to discuss and try to come to an agreement. However, all parties issued statements on February 4, 2020 that the talks had broken down. On February 3, the Office of the Wetʼsuwetʼen asked for a judicial review of the environmental approval for the pipeline.

On February 6, the RCMP began enforcing the injunction, arresting a total of 21 protesters at camps along the route between February 6 and 9. The largest of those camps is Unistʼotʼen Camp, directly in the proposed path of the pipeline, established in 2010 as a checkpoint, which has since added a healing centre. The arrests included protest organizers Karla Tait, Freda Huson and Brenda Michell. All were released within two days. The RCMP also detained several reporters and interfered with the freedom of the press. Union of British Columbia Indian Chiefs Grand Chief Stewart Phillip stated that "we are in absolute outrage and a state of painful anguish as we witness the Wetʼsuwetʼen people having their title and rights brutally trampled on and their right to self-determination denied."

On February 11, 2020, the RCMP announced that the road to the construction site was cleared and TC Energy announced that work would resume the following Monday. On February 21, 2020, the British Columbia Environmental Assessment Office (EAO) served notice that Coastal GasLink must halt construction on a segment of the route blocked by hereditary chiefs and enter into talks with the Wetʼsuwetʼen over the following 30 days. After the hereditary chiefs made it a condition for talks with government, the RCMP closed their local office and moved to their detachment in Houston on February 22.

Protests sprang up across Canada in solidarity with the Wetʼsuwetʼen hereditary chiefs. On February 11, protesters surrounded the BC Legislature in Victoria, preventing traditional ceremonies around the reading of the Throne Speech by the Lieutenant Governor. Members of the Legislature had to have police assistance to enter or used back or side entrances. Protesters assembled outside government offices in Victoria on February 14, and a representative of the BC government employees union advised its members to treat the protest as a picket line. Other protests took place in Nelson, Calgary, Regina, Winnipeg, Toronto, Ottawa, Sherbrooke, and Halifax.

Other First Nations, activists, land defenders and other supporters of the Wetʼsuwetʼen hereditary chiefs have targeted railway lines. Near Belleville, Ontario, members of the Mohawks of the Bay of Quinte First Nation began a blockade of the Canadian National Railway rail line just north of Tyendinaga Mohawk Territory on February 6, 2020, causing Via Rail to cancel trains on their Toronto–Montreal and Toronto-Ottawa routes. The line is critical to the CNR network in Eastern Canada as CNR has no other east–west rail lines through Eastern Ontario.

Other protests blocking rail lines halted service on Via Rail's Prince Rupert and Prince George lines, running on CNR tracks. Protests on the CNR line west of Winnipeg additionally blocked the only trans-Canada passenger rail route. Protests disrupted GO train lines in the Greater Toronto Area (GTA) and Exo's Candiac line in Montreal. Canadian Pacific Railway (CPR) rail lines were also disrupted in downtown Toronto and south of Montreal. The Société du Chemin de fer de la Gaspésie (SCFG) freight railway between Gaspé and Matapedia was blockaded on February 10 by members of the Listuguj Miꞌgmaq First Nation. The nation-wide blockades led to Via Rail and CNR shutting down most of their service across the country for most of February, with regular service resuming by early March.

Eventually, talks with government led to a memorandum of understanding over land rights and title between the Canadian government, the BC government, and the nine sitting house chiefs of the Wetʼsuwetʼen. However, the MOU did not address the issue of the pipeline, and both construction and opposition by the Wetʼsuwetʼen have continued.

2021 
Construction of the CGL continued in 2021 following extension of the environmental certificate, and land defenders continued to obstruct construction with direct action.

In September, at least two people were arrested when land defenders constructed several blockades and locked themselves to machinery at a drill site where CGL crews were preparing to drill under the Wedzin Kwa River.

In October, land defenders seized a CGL excavator and evicted construction workers from Wet'suwet'en territory.

On November 13, members of the Gidimt'en clan evicted construction workers, and when they refused to leave, land defenders seized an excavator, destroyed a segment of access road, and blocked a bridge with a crumpled minivan. Defenders criticized the RCMP for police brutality in previous encounters.

2022 

In the early hours of February 17, 2022, twenty masked attackers, some carrying axes, forced nine people to flee from a work site near Houston, British Columbia. They attacked and injured RCMP officers attempting to respond. Ellis Ross said "There were workers inside a truck while attackers were trying to light it on fire." Damage is estimated to be "in the millions of dollars" according to Coastal GasLink.

Non-compliance orders 
To date, Coastal GasLink has been issued several non-compliance orders, causing interruptions to construction work in certain areas along the route. In 2019, they faced an order after initiating work prior to informing trapline hunters near Houston. In spring 2020, Unistʼotʼen house group and Gidimtʼen clan members notified BC's Environmental Assessment Office (EAO) that CGL had damaged wetland areas. The assessment office found that the company's wetland management plan had not been followed in 42 wetlands areas, and issued another non-compliance order on June 16. A separate order was delivered on the same day due to the company's lack of efforts to mitigate harm to endangered Whitebark Pine in the area. A further non-compliance order was issued on June 22, 2020 for proceeding with work to clear the affected wetlands sites without conducting the appropriate environmental assessment surveys. These non-compliance orders have led to a cessation of construction within 30 metres of designated wetlands areas until all appropriate measures have been followed. the EAO also issued an enforcement order related to turbid water discharged into fish bearing Fraser Lake.

CGL's self-reporting on environmental compliance has also revealed violations.

Supreme Court challenge of environmental certificate 
On October 1, 2020, a hearing began in the BC Supreme Court, in which the Office of the Wet’suwet’en requested that the Court reject the Environmental Assessment Office's decision to extend CGL's environmental certificate for five years. The company had filed for a one-time extension of their previous five-year certificate in April 2019. Lawyers for the Office of the Wet’suwet’en cited the lack of meaningful accounting for the Final report on Missing and murdered Indigenous women and girls (MMIWG), published in June 2019, as well as the pipeline company's long history of non-compliance with the Environmental Assessment Office's own conditions and standards. The EAO's position was that there was no basis for judiciary review of their decision.

In April 2021, the B.C. Supreme Court ruled that all concerns raised by the Office of Wet'suwet'en were unfounded, and the court approved the extension of CGL's environmental certificate.

See also
 Enbridge Northern Gateway Pipelines
 Trans Mountain Pipeline
 Tsilhqot'in Nation v British Columbia

References

2020 controversies
2020 in British Columbia
Environmental issues in Canada
First Nations history
Indigenous peoples and the environment
Indigenous politics in Canada
Political controversies in Canada
Proposed pipelines in Canada
Wet'suwet'en
Environmental justice
Environmental controversies